Zlatoustovsky Uyezd (Златоустовский уезд) was one of the subdivisions of the Ufa Governorate of the Russian Empire. It was situated in the northeastern part of the governorate. Its administrative centre was Zlatoust.

Demographics
At the time of the Russian Empire Census of 1897, Zlatoustovsky Uyezd had a population of 185,498. Of these, 65.5% spoke Russian, 27.7% Bashkir, 5.2% Tatar, 1.2% Mordvin, 0.1% German and 0.1% Polish as their native language.

References

 
Uezds of Ufa Governorate
Ufa Governorate